The Cheval Gauvin (French: Gauvin horse) is a legendary evil horse of Franche-Comté, France and the Jura Mountains in Switzerland. It is said to frequent watercourses, forests or cemeteries and to kill those who mount it by drowning them or throwing them into chasms.

The horse is mentioned close to Chamblay by Désiré Monnier from 1854. It is a harbinger of death, and appears to have been a kind of bogeyman for children. Possibly a transformed lutin (hobgoblin) it is one of a number of legendary horses of Jura. Jean-Louis Thouard depicted it in 1996.

See also 
List of legendary horses
Kelpie
Cheval Mallet

Bibliography 
Désiré Monnier, Traditions populaires comparées, J. B. Dumoulin, 1854, 812 p.
Marie Émile Aimé Vingtrinier, Croyances et traditions populaires, 1874, 2e éd.
Henri Dontenville, Histoire et géographie mythiques de la France, G. P. Maisonneuve et Larose, 1973, 378 p.
Henri Dontenville, Mythologie française : Regard de l'histoire, Payot, 1973, 2e éd., 267 p.
Willy Borgeaud, Mythologie de la Suisse ancienne, vol. 2, Librairie de l'Université Georg, 1965, 141 p.
Arnold Van Gennep, Manuel de folklore français contemporain : Cycle des douze jours, vol. 7, Picard, 1987
Jean-Michel Doulet, Quand les démons enlevaient les enfants: les changelins : étude d'une figure mythique : Traditions & croyances, Presses de l'Université de Paris-Sorbonne, 2002, 433 p.
Hervé Thiry-Duval, L'esprit féerique. Dictionnaire des fées en Pays Comtois, Langres, Dominique Guéniot, 1 March 2005
Paul Sébillot, Le folklore de France, vol. 1, Librairie orientale & américaine, 1904, 977 p.
Jules Surdez et Gilbert Lovis, Animaux et contes fantastiques du Jura, Éditions du Pré-Carré, 1984, 164 p.
Jean-Louis Thouard, Bestiaire fantastique du pays de Comté, Édition Marie-Noëlle, 1er janvier 1996, 99 p.
Patricia Gaillard et Dominique Lesbros, Contes et légendes du Jura, Éditions de Borée, 2007, 536 p.

Horses in mythology
Franche-Comté
French folklore
Swiss folklore
French legendary creatures
Bogeymen